Velko Markoski (born 5 April 1986) is a Macedonian handball player who plays for RK Vardar 1961.

His brother Nikola is also a handball player.

References

1986 births
Living people
Macedonian male handball players
Sportspeople from Struga
Expatriate handball players
Macedonian expatriate sportspeople in Croatia
Macedonian expatriate sportspeople in Romania
RK Zagreb players
RK Vardar players